is a Japanese competitive swimmer who specializes in the breaststroke. She competed in the 2012 London Olympics at the age of 15 for the 200m Women's Breaststroke event. She again competed in the 2016 Summer Olympics in Rio De Janeiro. 

Her swimming coach is Ryuji Omi. She is the daughter of Keiji and Emiko Watanabe.

Watanabe won the silver medal in the 200m medley at the 2015 World Aquatics Championships in Kazan, Russia. She also won a gold medal in the 200 metres breaststroke, and she gave the gold medal to her coach, in a gesture of gratitude to him.

She has qualified to represent Japan at the 2020 Summer Olympics.

References

1996 births
Living people
Japanese female freestyle swimmers
Japanese female breaststroke swimmers
Japanese female medley swimmers
Olympic swimmers of Japan
Swimmers at the 2012 Summer Olympics
Swimmers at the 2016 Summer Olympics
Swimmers at the 2020 Summer Olympics
Sportspeople from Tokyo
Medalists at the FINA World Swimming Championships (25 m)
People from Katsushika
World Aquatics Championships medalists in swimming
Asian Games medalists in swimming
Swimmers at the 2014 Asian Games
Swimmers at the 2018 Asian Games
Universiade medalists in swimming
Asian Games gold medalists for Japan
Asian Games silver medalists for Japan
Medalists at the 2014 Asian Games
Medalists at the 2018 Asian Games
Universiade gold medalists for Japan
Medalists at the 2017 Summer Universiade
Medalists at the 2019 Summer Universiade
21st-century Japanese women